Dr. Ambedkar Nagar - Omkareshwar Road Passenger  was a metre-gauge passenger train of the Indian Railways, which was running between Dr. Ambedkar Nagar in Madhya Pradesh and Omkareshwar Road in Madhya Pradesh. It has being closed down on 30th January 2023 as the track between the two stations is being converted to Broad Gauge.

The last train on the 150-year-old metre gauge rail line associated with the heritage railways in western Madhya Pradesh was flagged off on 30th Jan 2023 as authorities halted train movement on the stretch indefinitely to facilitate its conversion into broad guage, an official said.

This was the last surviving metre-gauge train of the Akola–Ratlam line in Madhya Pradesh. After undergoing gauge conversion, it will provide connectivity between Indore and Southern Indian states.

Route and halts

The important halts of the train are:

Average speed and frequency

The Dr. Ambedkar Nagar - Sanawad Passenger  runs with an average speed of 29 km/h and completes 64 km in 2h 30m. The Sanawad - Dr. Ambedkar Nagar Passenger runs with an average speed of 29 km/h and completes 64 km in 2h 30m.

Coach composite

The train consists of 4 coaches:

 4 General
 2 Guard cum Luggage/parcel van

Traction

Both trains are hauled by a Mhow Loco Shed based YDM-4 diesel locomotive from Dr. Ambedkar Nagar to Omkareshwar Road and vice versa. Banker locomotive is attached from Kalakund to Patalpani due to steep incline .

See also 

 Dr. Ambedkar Nagar railway station
 Sanawad railway station
 Mhow Indore Passenger
 Akola–Ratlam rail line

Notes

References

External links 
 52963/Mhow Sanawad MG Passenger
 52964/Sanawad Mhow MG Passenger

Transport in Indore
Rail transport in Madhya Pradesh
Slow and fast passenger trains in India
Transport in Mhow